The 1982 FIBA Intercontinental Cup William Jones was the 16th edition of the FIBA Intercontinental Cup for men's basketball clubs and the 15th edition of the tournament in the form of a true intercontinental cup. It took place at Amsterdam, Rotterdam and Den Bosch, Netherlands.

Participants

League stage
Day 1, September 27 1982, Den Bosch

|}

Day 2, September 28 1982, Rotterdam

|}

Day 3, September 29 1982, Den Bosch

|}

Day 4, September 30 1982, Amsterdam

|}

Day 5, October 1 1982, Rotterdam

|}

Day 6, October 2 1982, Den Bosch

|}

Day 7, October 3 1982, Den Bosch

|}

Final standings

References

External links
 1982 Intercontinental Cup William Jones

1982
1982–83 in European basketball
1982–83 in South American basketball
1982–83 in American college basketball
1982 in Dutch sport
International basketball competitions hosted by the Netherlands